Davide Torosantucci (born 3 November 1981 in Lanciano) is an Italian former cyclist.

Palmares

2003
3rd GP Capodarco
3rd Gara Ciclistica Montappone
2005
1st Trofeo Internazionale Bastianelli
1st Gara Ciclistica Montappone
2008
1st Overall Grand Prix Cycliste de Gemenc
1st Prologue
2009
1st Overall Tour de Serbie
2011
1st Stage 4 Tour of South Africa

References

1981 births
Living people
Italian male cyclists
People from Lanciano
Sportspeople from the Province of Chieti
Cyclists from Abruzzo